In the theory of optimal binary search trees, the interleave lower bound is a lower bound on the number of operations required by a Binary Search Tree (BST) to execute a given sequence of accesses.

Several variants of this lower bound have been proven. This article is based on a variation of the first Wilber's bound. This lower bound is used in the design and analysis of Tango tree.  Furthermore, this lower bound can be rephrased and proven geometrically, Geometry of binary search trees.

Definition 

The bound is based on a fixed perfect BST , called the lower bound tree, over the keys .

[([1] 2 [3]) 4 ([5] 6 [7])]

Consider the following access sequence: .
 Null - otherwise.

For example, if the sequence of accesses is:  then the label of the root  is: "RRL", the label of 6 is: "RL", and the label of 2 is: "L".

The interleave bound, is the sum of the interleaving through all the nodes of the tree.

The Lower Bound Statement and its Proof 

The interleave bound is summarized by the following theorem.

The following proof is based on.

Proof 
Let  be an access sequence. Denote by  the state of an arbitrary BST at time  i.e. after executing the sequence . We also fix a lower bound BST .

In the following Lemma, we will show that transition point is well-defined. 

 

The second lemma that we need to prove states that the transition point is stable. It will not change until it is touched.

 

The last Lemma toward the proof states that every node  has its unique transition point.

Now, we are ready to prove the theorem. First of all, observe that the number of touched transition points by the offline BST algorithm is a lower bound on its cost, we are counting less nodes than the required for the total cost.

In fact, it is the deeper one. Then  is the amount of interleaving through the node . Similarly, an access to a node in  must touch . Consider every . However, by Lemma 2, such change requires touching the transition point. Summing over all ,

       

where  is the amount of interleave through . That concludes the proof.

See also 
 Tango tree
 Optimal binary search tree
Geometry of binary search trees

References 

Binary trees